Pop group may refer to:

 a band that plays some genre of popular music 
 a band that plays pop music (a particular genre of popular music) 
 The Pop Group, a British post-punk band
 Pop! (group), a 2000s UK pop group